Gokhale Education Society's R. H. Sapat College of Engineering, Management Studies and Research, is an All India Council for Technical Education (AICTE) approved technical institute for higher learning, offering graduate, post graduate and doctoral level education facilities in Engineering and computer Science, located at Nashik, near Pune, India. The college campus of 10 acres is in the heart of the city, on College Road.

Background

The institute is affiliated to Savitribai Phule Pune University. Gokhale Education Society was established by Trimbak Appa Kulkarni, in memory of his mentor, Gopal Krishna Gokhale, Indian freedom fighter and known to be the spiritual guide of Mahatma Gandhi, on 19 February 1918, three years to the death of the leader, to provide holistic education to the poor and the needy. The Society now manages 17 centres and 121 institutions in Nashik, Thane and Mumbai, said to be tutoring 125,000 students with the help of 4000 staff.

The college is ISO-9001:2000 certified and provides graduate, post graduate and research facilities in engineering and computer science.

Facilities
R. H. Sapat College is equipped with facilities such as a workshop, central library, laboratories, internet, audio visual and medical facilities, sports and gymnasium, cafeteria, hostel and staff quarters.

Courses
The College offers various AICTE approved courses, in affiliation to Pune University such as:
 Bachelor of Engineering (B. E.) in Civil, Computer, Electrical, Electronics and Telecommunication and Mechanical Engineering
 Master of Engineering (M. E.) in Computer, Mechanical Engineering Design, Digital Systems and Power Electronics and Drives
 Master in Computer Application (M.C.A.)

The College also offers research platforms on the above subjects.

References

External links
 on Wikimapia
 Profile on Infermap
 on Public Info path
 on All About India
 on Joint Directorate of Technical Education, Maharashtra State government web site

Education in Nashik
Engineering colleges in Maharashtra
Educational organisations based in India